Grigor Dimitrov was the defending champion, but chose not to participate this year.
Guillermo García López won the title, defeating Jiří Veselý in the final, 7–6(7–5), 7–6(13–11).

Seeds
The top four seeds receive a bye into the second round.

Draw

Finals

Top half

Bottom half

Qualifying

Seeds

Qualifiers

Qualifying draw

First qualifier

Second qualifier

Third qualifier

Fourth qualifier

References
 Main Draw
 Qualifying Draw

2015 ATP World Tour
2015 Singles